Lori is a female given name, a variant of Laura and Lorraine.

People
 Lori Alan (born 1966), American voice actress
 Lori Alhadeff (born 1975), American activist
 Lori Balmer (born 1958), Australian singer
 Lori Berenson (born 1969), American activist
 Lori Cardille (born 1954), American actress
 Lori Douglas, Canadian judge
 Lori Dupuis (born 1972), Canadian ice hockey player
 Lori Dungey (born 1957), New Zealand actress
 Lori Ehrlich (born 1963), American politician
 Lori Foster, American romance novelist
 Lori Goldstein, American fashion designer
 Lori Greiner, American entrepreneur and television personality
 Lori Hoey
 Lori Lewis (born 1972), American singer
 Lori Lieberman, American singer-songwriter
 Lori Lightfoot, American politician
 Lori Loughlin (born 1964), American actress
 Lori McKenna, American singer and songwriter
 Lori Petty, American actress
 Lori Piestewa, American soldier
 Lori Singer, American actress
 Lori Trahan (born 1973), American politician
 Lori Wilson, American politician and lawyer

Fictional characters
 Lori, a character in the 2012 remake of Total Recall, played by Kate Beckinsale
 Lori Collins, a character in the 2012 film, Ted, played by Mila Kunis
 Lori Grimes, a character in the comic and TV series The Walking Dead, played by Sarah Wayne Callies
 Lori Quaid, a character in the 1990 film Total Recall, played by Sharon Stone
 Lori Weston, a character in the TV series Hawaii Five-0, played by Lauren German
 Lori Loud, in the TV series The Loud House
 Lori Carmichael, a character in Mary Stanton's Unicorns of Balinor book series
 Lori Milligan, a character in the film, The Final Destination
 Lori Nguyen, a character in the book TEN by Gretchen McNeil and the 2017 film adaptation Ten: Murder Island played by Raquel Castro
 Lori Jiménez, a child character in the anime series, Transformers: Cybertron

See also
 Lorrie, given name
 Laurie (given name)

Given names
Feminine given names
English feminine given names